Olga Lauristin (née Künnapuu; 28 April 1903 Kolga Parish (now Kuusalu Parish), Kreis Harrien – 25 June 2005) was a Soviet Estonian politician.

From 1944 until 1947, she was Minister of Social Welfare.
 
Her first husband was politician Johannes Lauristin and her daughter was politician and media researcher Marju Lauristin. She later married Hendrik Allik in 1945 and the couple had a son, theatre critic and director and politician Jaak Allik in 1946. The couple remained married until Allik's death in 1989.

References

1903 births
2005 deaths
People from Kuusalu Parish
People from Kreis Harrien
Communist Party of Estonia politicians
Members of the Central Committee of the Communist Party of Estonia
People's commissars and ministers of the Estonian Soviet Socialist Republic
Members of the Supreme Soviet of the Estonian Soviet Socialist Republic, 1940–1947
First convocation members of the Soviet of Nationalities
Second convocation members of the Soviet of Nationalities
Third convocation members of the Soviet of Nationalities
Estonian prisoners and detainees
Estonian centenarians
Women centenarians
Recipients of the Order of the Red Banner of Labour
Recipients of the Order of Friendship of Peoples
Women government ministers of Estonia